The Chief Kashakes House, also known as the Eagle Tail House and Chief Kah-Shakes House, is a historic Tlingit clan house in Saxman, Alaska.  Built in 1895 using balloon framing, the two story wood-frame structure was the first structure built in Saxman, and is the only surviving clan house of its type there.  It has a hip roof, and is clad in shiplap siding.  The front originally had a porch extending across the full width, but this has been reduced to just the central portion.  Three totem poles flank the building, two eagle-topped poles to the right and a beaver pole to the left.  An old Russian cannon stands near the house.

The house was listed on the National Register of Historic Places in 1993.

See also
National Register of Historic Places listings in Ketchikan Gateway Borough, Alaska

References

External links
 
 

Houses completed in 1895
Houses on the National Register of Historic Places in Alaska
Houses in Ketchikan Gateway Borough, Alaska
Buildings and structures on the National Register of Historic Places in Ketchikan Gateway Borough, Alaska